Mind the Gap (Swedish: Se upp för dårarna) is a 2007 Swedish film directed by Helena Bergström.

Plot
The movie tells the story of Yasmin Demiroglu whose family moved from Turkey to Stockholm when she was eight years old. Yasmin's father Sinan had a good reputation as a cardio-thoracic surgeon while living in Turkey and is thus very unsatisfied with his job in Sweden – he is an underground train driver. Yasmin, 20 years of age, wants to show that she can fill an important position in society and has the big ambition of becoming the Minister of Justice of Sweden. Of course she has to begin in a small way and so she starts a police officer's apprenticeship at "Polishögskolan" where she meets Elin, a Swedish girl. The two of them become friends. Soon their relationship to each other and to their families are put to the test as several unexpected twists and turns take place.

Cast
Nina Zanjani as Yasmin Demiroglu
Rakel Wärmländer as Elin Enecke
Korhan Abay as Sinan Demiroglu
Zinat Pirzadeh as Ayse Demiroglu
Dan Ekborg as Ulf Enecke
Birgitte Söndergaard as Ewa Enecke
Lars Bethke as Stefan Ljungsäter
Stella Enciso as Dilek Demiroglu
Mattias Redbo as Henke Larsson
Rasim Öztekin as Turkish Minister of Foreign Relations
Erik Johansson as Axel Enecke

External links

Swedish comedy-drama films
2000s Swedish-language films
2000s Swedish films